Breach, Breached, or The Breach may refer to:

Places
 Breach, Kent, United Kingdom
 Breach, West Sussex, United Kingdom
 The Breach, Great South Bay in the State of New York

People
Breach (DJ), an Electronic/House music act
Miroslava Breach (1963–2017), Mexican journalist

Arts, entertainment, and media

Films
 Breach (2007 film), a film directed by Billy Ray starring Chris Cooper and Ryan Phillippe
 Breach (2020 film), a 2020 film starring Bruce Willis
 The Breach (film), a 1970 French film by Claude Chabrol

Games
 Breach (1987 video game), a 1987 action game by Omnitrend Software
 Breach (2011 video game), a defunct 2011 first-person shooter by Atomic Games
 Breach (2018 video game), a cancelled 2018 action RPG by QC Games
 Breached (video game), a 2016 action puzzle by Drama Drifters
 Breach, an agent from the 2020 first-person shooter Valorant

Journalism
 The Breach (media outlet), an online, Canadian news outlet launched in 2021

Music

Groups
 Breach (band), a Swedish post-hardcore band
 Breached, a Canadian rock band

Albums
 Breach (Lewis Capaldi EP), 2018
 Breach (Shivaree EP), 2004
 Breach (The Wallflowers album), 2000

Songs
 "Breach (Walk Alone)", 2018, by Martin Garrix and Blinders
 "Breach", a song by Erra from the 2018 album Neon

Television
 "Breach", a 2010 episode of the first season of NCIS: Los Angeles
 "The Breach" (Star Trek: Enterprise), a 2003 episode of the second season of Star Trek: Enterprise

Other arts, entertainment, and media
 Breach (character), a superhero from DC Comics
 Warp core breach, a catastrophic event aboard a starship in the Star Trek fictional universe

Law
 Breach of confidence, a common law tort that protects private information that is conveyed in confidence
 Breach of contract, a situation in which a binding agreement is not honored by one or more of the parties to the contract
 Breach of duty of care, common law negligence
 Breach of promise, a former common law tort
 Breach of property, a civil wrong against property, either trespass to land or trespass to chattels
 Breach of the peace, a legal term used in constitutional law in English-speaking countries
 Efficient breach, a breach of contract that the breaching party considers desirable
 Fundamental breach, a breach so fundamental that it permits the aggrieved party to terminate performance of the contract

Science, social science, and technology
 BREACH, a security exploit against the HTTPS protocol
Breach, whale surfacing behaviour (a whale's leap out of the water)
 Breaching experiment, a social experiment that tests people's reactions to the violation of accepted social norms
 Data breach, the release of secure or private information to an untrusted environment
 Security breach, unauthorized access to a computer

Other uses
 Door breaching, a process to force open closed and/or locked doors

See also
 Breech (disambiguation)
 Tortious interference, a tort involving inducing persons to breach a contract